Globasnitz (Slovene: Globasnica) is a town in the district of Völkermarkt in the Austrian state of Carinthia.

Population
A considerable percentage (42.1%) of the population are Carinthian Slovenes, and Slovene is a second official language of the municipality.

History
In the Carinthian Plebiscite of 1920, Sankt Jakob was one of the 17 Carinthian municipalities, where the majority of the population (52%) voted for the annexation to the Kingdom of Serbs, Croats and Slovenes (Yugoslavia).

References

External links

Cities and towns in Völkermarkt District